Góra Siewierska  is a village in the administrative district of Gmina Psary, within Będzin County, Silesian Voivodeship, in southern Poland.

The village has a population of 770.

In the years 1975-1998, the village administratively belonged to the Katowice province.

References

Góra Siewierska – wieś w Polsce położona w województwie śląskim, w powiecie będzińskim, w gminie Psary.

W latach 1975-1998 miejscowość administracyjnie należała do województwa katowickiego.

Villages in Będzin County